The La Joya Formation is a Jurassic period geologic formation in north central Mexico. It is located in the Sierra Madre Oriental range, in southwestern Tamaulipas state.

It preserves fossils dating back to the Jurassic period.

See also 
 List of fossiliferous stratigraphic units in Mexico

References 

Jurassic Mexico
Geography of Tamaulipas
Geologic formations of Mexico
Natural history of Tamaulipas
Jurassic System of North America
Carboniferous southern paleotropical deposits